Grand Prix motorcycle racing is the premier championship of motorcycle road racing, which has been divided into three classes since the 1990 season: 125cc, 250cc and MotoGP, with the addition of MotoE, an electric motorcycle class, in 2019. Classes that have been discontinued include 350cc and 50cc/80cc. The Grand Prix Road-Racing World Championship was established in 1949 by the sport's governing body, the Fédération Internationale de Motocyclisme (FIM), and is the oldest motorsport World Championship.

There were four classes when the championship started in 1949; 500cc, 350cc, 250cc and 125cc. The 50cc class was introduced in the 1962 season. Due to escalating costs that resulted in a number of manufacturers leaving the championship, the FIM limited the 50cc bikes to a single cylinder, the 125cc and 250cc bikes were limited to two cylinders and the 350cc and 500cc bikes were limited to four cylinders. The 350cc class was discontinued in 1982; two years later the 50cc class was replaced with an 80cc class, which was discontinued in 1989. In 2002, 990cc bikes replaced the 500cc bikes and the class was renamed as MotoGP. 600cc bikes replaced the 250cc bikes in the 2010 season, with the class re-branded as Moto2.

Giacomo Agostini, with 15 victories, has won the most world championships. Ángel Nieto is second with 13 world championships and Valentino Rossi, Mike Hailwood and Carlo Ubbiali are third with 9 world championships. Agostini holds the record for the most victories in the 500cc/MotoGP and 350cc classes with eight and seven world championships respectively. Phil Read and Max Biaggi have won the most 250cc/Moto2 championships, with four victories each. Nieto won the most championships in the 125cc and 50cc/80cc classes with seven and six victories respectively.

Champions

By rider

By country

See also
List of Grand Prix motorcycle racing World Riders' Champions by year

References
Bibliography
 

General
 

Specific

External links
The Official MotoGP Website

World Champions
Grand Prix motorcycle racing World Championship riders
Morotcycle